Frederik Foersom   (June 13, 1805 – May 4, 1854) was a Danish composer and organist.

Notable works 
Rind nu op i Jesu navn (1846)
Rondolette (piano 1854)
Jubel-Cantate (1840)
Morgensang
Reformations-Cantate
Seiersmarsch (piano)
Sørge-Cantate
Syngeøvelser til Brug ved Sang-Undervisningen i Borger- og Almueskoler (1850)
Din Skaal og min Skaal
Rondo à la turca (piano)
Variations sur un theme original (piano)

See also
List of Danish composers

References
This article was initially translated from the Danish Wikipedia.

Male composers
Danish classical organists
Male classical organists
1805 births
1854 deaths
19th-century Danish composers
19th-century male musicians
19th-century organists